Swainsona behriana, commonly known as Southern Swainson-pea, is a small perennial plant in the family Fabaceae that is native to Australia.  It grows to 15 cm high, has hairy stems and pinnate leaves that are 3 to 5 cm long. Racemes of 2 to 7 purple pea flowers are produced from August to January in the species' native range. The pods that follow are 10 to 18 mm long.

It usually occurs in grassland in forest clearings in South Australia, Victoria and New South Wales. The species is listed as "vulnerable" in South Australia and "rare" in Victoria.

References 

behriana
Fabales of Australia
Flora of New South Wales
Flora of South Australia
Flora of Victoria (Australia)
Taxa named by John McConnell Black
Taxa named by Ferdinand von Mueller